Isaac Blessing Jacob is a 1638 oil on canvas painting by the Dutch artist Govert Flinck, now in the Rijksmuseum in Amsterdam with the catalogue number SK-A-110.

Description 
The bible recounts of how Jacob pretended to be his brother Esau which tricks his blind father Isaac to bless him. The art style is reminiscent of Rembrandt, whom Flinck was trained by.

References 

Paintings by Govaert Flinck
Paintings in the collection of the Rijksmuseum
1638 paintings
Flinck